Fontibon is the 9th locality of Bogotá. It is located in the west of the city. This district is mostly inhabited by low and middle class residents.

Etymology 
The origin of the city's name can be traced to the Muisca cacique Huintiva or Hyntiba (meaning "powerful cacique" in Muysccubun) and the mutation of the word to its present spelling, being this among other names such as Ontibon and Hontibón.

History 
Fontibón was part of the southern Muisca Confederation in the times before the Spanish conquest. It was incorporated into the newly formed capital district of Bogotá on December 17, 1954. Fontibon was the gate to the current city of Bogotá founded as Santa Fe de Bogotá, for conquistador Gonzalo Jimenez de Quesada and his fellow expeditioners.

The city was cradle to the residence of Peter Claver. Little by little the community became one of the most idolizing and religious. The city started to expand, and in the sixteenth century it was divided into 22 "capitanias". Fontibon's original maps constitute one of Colombia's oldest documents. In the year 1956, Fontibon was merged with Bogotá, losing its status as "associate town".

Economy 
The neighborhood has the headquarters of SATENA.

Monuments 
 Fontibón Cathedral
 San Antonio Bridge

Transportation 
The city is still far away from Bogota's major mass transport system, the TransMilenio. Fontibon's main highway leads to Medellín.

References

External links 

 Official website

Localities of Bogotá
Muysccubun